Agaronia jesuitarum is a species of sea snail, a marine gastropod mollusk in the family Olividae, the olives.

Description
Agaronia jesuitarum has a small, thin shell. Subfusiform; a high spire, straight sided. The length of the shell is about 22mm, body whorl not inflated.

Distribution

References

Olividae
Gastropods described in 1988